Ruggero Santini (April 16, 1870 – April 4, 1958) was an Italian general. He was the colonial governor of Somaliland. He fought in the First Italo-Ethiopian War and Italo-Turkish War. In World War I he fought against Austria-Hungary.

During the Second Italo-Ethiopian War he commanded the 1st Corps and fought in the North against the Ethiopians.

Awards
Commemorative Medal for the Italo-Austrian War 1915–1918

References

External links
 

1870 births
1958 deaths
Italian generals
Italian military personnel of World War I
Italian military personnel of the First Italo-Ethiopian War
Italian military personnel of the Italo-Turkish War